Mosop Constituency is an electoral constituency in Kenya. It is one of six constituencies of Nandi County. The constituency was established for the 1966 elections.  The constituency has seven wards, all electing Members of County Assembly (MCAs) for the Nandi County Assembly.

Members of Parliament

Wards

References 

Constituencies in Nandi County
Constituencies in Rift Valley Province
1966 establishments in Kenya
Constituencies established in 1966